Anton Davidoglu (June 30, 1876–May 27, 1958) was a Romanian mathematician who specialized in differential equations. 

He was born in 1876 in Bârlad, Vaslui County, the son of Profira Moțoc and Doctor Cleante Davidoglu. His older brother was General Cleante Davidoglu. 

He studied under Jacques Hadamard at the École Normale Supérieure in Paris, defending his Ph.D. dissertation in 1900. His thesis — the first mathematical investigation of deformable solids — applied Émile Picard's method of successive approximations to the study of fourth order differential equations that model traverse vibrations of non-homogeneous elastic bars.

After returning to Romania, Davidoglu became a professor at the University of Bucharest. In 1913, he was founding rector of the
Academy of High Commercial and Industrial Studies in Bucharest. He also continued to teach at the University of Bucharest, until his retirement in 1941.

Davidoglu was a founding member of the Romanian Academy of Sciences, and was featured on a 1976 Romanian postage stamp. He died in 1958 in Bucharest.

Publications

References

1876 births
1958 deaths
People from Bârlad
Romanian expatriates in France
École Normale Supérieure alumni
Academic staff of the University of Bucharest
20th-century Romanian mathematicians
Mathematical analysts
Academic staff of the Bucharest Academy of Economic Studies
Members of the Romanian Academy of Sciences